Jay C. Smith (June 5, 1928 – May 12, 2009) was a high school principal in Pennsylvania who was convicted and sentenced to death in 1986 for the 1979 murder of Susan Reinert and her two children, Karen and Michael. He spent six years on Pennsylvania's death row until his conviction was overturned by the Pennsylvania Supreme Court due to prosecutorial misconduct.

Smith's daughter Stephanie Hunsberger and her husband were reported missing in 1978 and never have been found.

Smith was principal of Upper Merion Area High School in King of Prussia, Pennsylvania. Reinert and her colleague, William Bradfield, were teachers at the same school, where Reinert taught English. In 1983, Bradfield was convicted of conspiracy to commit the same murders; he was the sole beneficiary of Reinert's life insurance. He was sentenced to life imprisonment and died in 1998. 

Smith died on May 12, 2009 of a heart condition.

References 

Principal Suspect by William Costopoulos
Engaged to Murder by Loretta Schwartz-Nobel
Echoes in the Darkness by Joseph Wambaugh
Madison Street Methodist Church (Chester, PA) Baptism Records

1928 births
2009 deaths
American prisoners sentenced to death
Murder convictions without a body
Overturned convictions in the United States
People from Upper Merion Township, Pennsylvania
Prisoners sentenced to death by Pennsylvania
American school principals